Steroid 5-alpha-reductase 3, also known as 3-oxo-5-alpha-steroid 4-dehydrogenase 3, is an enzyme that in humans is encoded by the SRD5A3 gene. It is one of three forms of 5α-reductase.

See also
 SRD5A3-CDG
 Congenital disorder of glycosylation
Kahrizi syndrome, a syndrome caused by a mutation in this gene

References

Further reading

EC 1.3.99